Eureka is an unincorporated community in Walla Walla County, in the U.S. state of Washington.

History
Eureka was laid out in 1904, and named after nearby Eureka Flat. A post office called Eureka was established in 1889, and remained in operation until 1964.

References

Unincorporated communities in Walla Walla County, Washington
Unincorporated communities in Washington (state)